Marco Baffi (born 1 March 1964) is an Italian male retired decathlete, which participated at the 1991 World Championships in Athletics.

Personal best
Decathlon: 7763 pts ( Brescia, 19 May 1991)
100 m: 11.26 (+1.0), long jump: 7.08 m, shot put: 13.88 m, high jump: 2.03 m, 400 m: 49.58;
 110 m hs: 15.34 (+0.9), discus throw: 44.84 m, pole vault: 4.70 m, javelin throw: 52.80 m, 1500 m: 4:34.08

Achievements

See also
 Italian all-time top lists - Decathlon

References

External links
 
 Marco Baffi at All-Athletics

1964 births
Italian decathletes
World Athletics Championships athletes for Italy
Living people